The 2010 edition of the UEMOA Tournament was the fourth edition of the competition. It took place between 7 and 14 November 2010 in Niamey, Niger.

Competing teams

Squads

Benin

Burkina Faso

Côte d'Ivoire

Guinea-Bissau

Mali

Niger

Senegal

Togo

Group stage

Group A

Group B

Final

References

External links
Official Site - https://web.archive.org/web/20090131052428/http://www.tournoiuemoa.com//

2010
2010 in African football
2010 in Nigerien sport